The 1909 European Figure Skating Championships were held from January 23 to January 24 in Budapest, Hungary. Budapest was part of the Austrian Empire at this time. Elite figure skaters competed for the title of European Champion in the category of men's singles.

Results

Men

Judges:
 C. Fillunger 
 Georg Helfrich 
 R. Holletschek  (CSR)
 E. Hörle 
 E. von Markus 
 L. Niedermayer 
 Oskar Uhlig

References

Sources
 Result List provided by the ISU

European Figure Skating Championships, 1909
European Figure Skating Championships
1909 in Hungarian sport
International figure skating competitions hosted by Hungary
January 1909 sports events
1900s in Budapest
International sports competitions in Budapest